The Sinnamary brush-tailed rat (Isothrix sinnamariensis), is a species of rodent in the family Echimyidae. It is found in French Guiana, Guyana, and possibly Suriname. Its natural habitat is subtropical or tropical moist lowland forests.

References

Isothrix
Mammals described in 1996
Taxonomy articles created by Polbot